The Sacred Mountains of China are divided into several groups. The Five Great Mountains refers to five of the most renowned mountains  in Chinese history, and they were the subjects of imperial pilgrimage by emperors throughout ages. They are associated with the supreme God of Heaven and the five main cosmic deities of Chinese traditional religion. The group associated with Buddhism is referred to as the Four Sacred Mountains of Buddhism, and the group associated with Taoism is referred to as the Four Sacred Mountains of Taoism.

The sacred mountains have all been important destinations for pilgrimage, the Chinese expression for pilgrimage being a shortened version of an expression which means "paying respect to a holy mountain".

The Five Great Mountains

The Five Great Mountains or Wuyue are arranged according to the five cardinal directions of Chinese geomancy, which includes the center as a direction. The grouping of the five mountains appeared during the Warring States period (475 BC – 221 BC), and the term Wuyue ("Five Summits") was made popular during the reign of Emperor Wudi of the Western Han Dynasty 140-87 BC. In Chinese traditional religion they have cosmological and theological significance as the representation, on the physical plane of earth, of the ordered world emanating from the God of Heaven (Tian–Shangdi), inscribing the Chinese territory as a tán, the Chinese concept equivalent of the Indian mandala.

The five mountains are among the best-known natural landmarks in Chinese history, and since the early periods in Chinese history, they have been the ritual sites of imperial worship and sacrifice by various emperors. The first legendary sovereigns of China went on excursions or formed processions to the summits of the Five Great Mountains. Every visit took place at the same time of the year. The excursions were hunting trips and ended in ritual offerings to the reigning god.

The emperors, starting with the First Emperor of Qin, formalized these expeditions and incorporated them into state ritual as prescribed by Confucianism. With every new dynasty, the new emperor hurried to the Five Great Mountains in order to lay claim to his newly acquired domains. Barring a number of interruptions, this imperial custom was preserved until the end of the last dynasty, when, after the fall of the Qing Dynasty in 1911, Yuan Shikai had himself crowned as emperor at the Temple of Heaven in Beijing. But just to be safe, he also made an offer to the god of the northern Mount Heng.

In the 2000s formal sacrifices both in Confucian and Taoist styles have been resumed. The Five Great Mountains have become places of pilgrimage where hundreds of pilgrims gather in temples and caves. Although the Five Great Mountains are not traditionally canonized as having any exclusive religious affiliations, many of them have a strong Taoist presence, thus the five mountains are also grouped by some as part of "Sacred Taoist Mountains". There are also various Buddhist temples and Confucian academies built on these mountains.

Alternatively, these mountains are sometimes referred to by the respective directions: the "Northern Great Mountain", "Southern Great Mountain", "Eastern Great Mountain", "Western Great Mountain", and "Central Great Mountain".

According to Chinese mythology, the Five Great Mountains originated from the body of Pangu, the first being and the creator of the world. Because of its eastern location, Mount Tài is associated with the rising sun which signifies birth and renewal. Due to this interpretation, it is often regarded as the most sacred of the Five Great Mountains. In accordance with its special position, Mount Tài is believed to have been formed out of Pangu's head. Mount Heng in Hunan is believed to be a remainder of Pangu's right arm, Mount Heng in Shanxi of his left arm, Mount Song of his belly, and Mount Hua of his feet.

Nature conservation 
In ancient times mountains were places of authority and fear, ruled by dark forces and faithfully worshipped. One reason for such worship was the value of the mountains to human existence as a spring of welfare and fertility, as the birthplace of rivers, as a place where herbs and medicinal plants grew and as a source of materials to build houses and tools. A basic element of Taoist thought was, and still is, an intuitive feeling of connectedness with nature. As early as the fourth century, the Taoists presented the high priests with the 180 precepts of Lord Lao for how to live a good and honest life. Twenty of these precepts focused explicitly on the conservation of nature, while many other precepts were indirectly aimed at preventing the destruction of nature. Respect for nature has been a key component of Taoism from the very outset and, in its own right, explains why the Five Great Mountains are considered sacred. In addition, Taoists consider mountains as a means of communication between heaven and earth and as the place where immortality can be found. The sanctity of the Five Great Mountains is the reason why even today these mountains still host an exceptional diversity of plants, trees and animal species.

East Great Mountain: Tài Shān

"Tranquil Mountain" Shāndōng Province,  
This mountain is associated with Feng Shan and by extension the Mandate of Heaven and life or death, being the most important of all the mountains

West Great Mountain: Huà Shān

"Splendid Mountain"
Shaanxi Province (Shănxī),

South Great Mountain: Héng Shān (Hunan)

"Balancing Mountain", Húnán Province,

North Great Mountain: Héng Shān (Shanxi)

"Permanent Mountain", Shānxī Province,  

In the course of history, there had been more than one location with the designation for Mount Heng, the North Great Mountain.

The Great Northern Mountain was designated on the original Mount Heng with the main peak known as Mount Damao today, located at the intersection of present-day Fuping County, Laiyuan County and Tang County in Hebei province.

Mount Heng was renamed Mount Chang to avoid the taboo of sharing the same personal name as Emperor Wen of Han.  The appellations Heng and Chang were used extensively in the past to name various districts in the region, such as Changshan Prefecture, Hengshan Prefecture, and Hengzhou.

While it was customary of the ethnic Han emperors to order rites to be performed regularly to honour the Five Great Mountains, the location of the original Mount Heng meant that for much of the eras of fragmentation, the region was either under non-Han rulers or a contested area.  The shrines built to perform the rites were neglected and damaged from time and natural disasters.  The decline was especially acute after the overthrow of the Yuan Dynasty when the local population fell sharply after the wars.

This created opportunities for Ming Dynasty officials who were natives of Shanxi to spread rumours that the spirit of Mount Heng had abandoned the original location and settled on Xuanwu Mountain in Hunyuan County in Shanxi.  Between the reigns of Emperor Hongzhi and Emperor Wanli, they kept petitioning the emperors to declare the change and decree for the rites for the Northern Great Mountain to be shifted there.  In 1586, Emperor Wanli opted a compromise by re-designating the Xuanwu Mountain as Mount Heng, but ordered the relevant rites to continue to be performed in the historic Beiyue Temple.

The movement for the change persisted after the demise of the Ming Dynasty and into the Qing Dynasty.  Finally, Emperor Shunzhi consented to have the rites to be moved to Shanxi as well.

Center Great Mountain: Sōng Shān

"Lofty Mountain", Hénán Province,

Sacred Mountains of Buddhism

In Chinese Buddhism, the Four "Sacred Mountains of China" are:

Wǔtái Shān

"Five-Platform Mountain", Shānxī Province, 

Wutai is the home of the Bodhisattva of wisdom, Manjusri or Wenshu in Chinese.

Éméi Shān

"High and Lofty Mountain", Sìchuān Province,  

The patron bodhisattva of Emei is Samantabhadra, known in Chinese as Puxian.

Jǐuhuá Shān

"Nine Glories Mountain", Ānhuī Province, 

Many of the mountain's shrines and temples are dedicated to Ksitigarbha (known in Chinese as Dìzàng, in Japanese as Jizō), who is a bodhisattva and protector of beings in hell realms

Pǔtuó Shān

"Mount Potalaka (Sanskrit)", Zhèjiāng Province,  

This mountain is considered the bodhimanda of Avalokitesvara (Guan Yin), bodhisattva of compassion. It became a popular pilgrimage site and received imperial support in the Song Dynasty.

Other sacred mountains 

Mount Xuedou (雪竇山) has been recently promoted as a fifth sacred mountain of Chinese Buddhism. This was first advocated by Changxing (1896-1939), an associate of the famous reformer Taixu. Xuedou mountain is seen as the sacred place of bodhisattva Maitreya. It is located 8 kilometers north-west of Xikou Town, Fenghua City, Zhejiang. Xuedou Mountain is at 29°41'3.1"N, 121°7'12.0"E. Mount Xuedou is home to the newly expanded Xuedou monastery, which was originally founded in the Jin Dynasty and is connected with the eccentric monk named Budai, who is considered to have been an emanation of Maitreya. 

Fanjing shan part of the Wuling Mountains in Tongren, Guizhou, is another sacred mountain associated with Maitreya. It is also a UNESCO World Heritage Site. Fanjing shan is also often claimed to be the fifth sacred mountain of Chinese Buddhism.

Lu shan is also an important sacred mountain in Chinese Buddhism, especially for Pure Land Buddhism. It is the site Donglin Temple, founded by the Pure Land patriarch Huiyuan.

Five Mountains of Chan Buddhism 
Chan Buddhism developed the Five Mountains and Ten Temples System (五山十刹, wushan shicha) during the late Southern Song (1127–1279).

The five mountains where the top Chan monasteries in the empire were located were:

 Lingyin Temple (灵隐寺, Lingyin si) on Lingyin mountain, Hang prefecture, Qiantang county
 Jingci Temple (净慈寺, Jingci si) on Nanping mountain, Hang prefecture, Qiantang county
 Jingshan Temple (径山寺, Jingshan si) on Jing mountain, Hang prefecture, Lin'an county
 Tiantong Temple (天童寺, Tiantong si) on Tiantong mountain, Ming prefecture, Yin county
 Ayuwang Temple (阿育王寺, Ayuwang si) on Ayuwang mountain, Ming prefecture, Yin county

The Four Sacred Mountains of Taoism

The "Four Sacred Mountains" of Taoism are:

Wǔdāng Shān

Literally "Military Wherewithal"; northwestern part of Hubei. Main peak:  .  .

It is the home to a complex of Taoist temples and monasteries associated with the Lord of the North, Xuantian Shangdi. It is also renowned as being the place of origin for Tai chi.

Lónghŭ Shān

Literally "Dragon and Tiger", Jiangxi.  Main peak:  . 

It is famous for being one of the birthplaces of Taoism and particularly important to the Zhengyi Dao, with many Taoist temples built upon the mountainside.

Qíyún Shān

Literally "Neat Clouds", Anhui.  Main peak:  .

Qīngchéng Shān

Literally "Misty Green City Wall"; (Nearby city: Dujiangyan, Sichuan. Main peak:   (surveyed in 2007). In ancient Chinese history, Mount Qingcheng area was famous for being for "The most secluded place in China".  .

See also
Sacred mountains
Grotto-heavens, Sacred grottoes, sometimes associated with sacred mountains

Other mountains with spiritual/religious significance in China 
 Three Famous Mountains (Three Shan)
 Mount Lu
 Mount Huang
 Yandang
 Five Garrison Mountains (Five Zhen)
 Yiwulü Mountain
 Mount Yi
 Mount Wu
 Mount Huo
 Kuaiji
Mount Lao
Mount Mian
Mount Sanqing
Gongga
Mount Changbai - regarded by Manchus of the Qing dynasty as Holy Mountain
Kunlun Mountains - the location of the peach tree of immortality wardened by Xiwangmu, the Queen Mother of the West
Mount Tian 
 Three Holy Mountain Peaks at Daocheng
 Chanodug
 Chenresig
 Jambeyang
 Four Sacred Mountains in Tibetan Buddhism 
 Amne Machin
 Kailash
 Ghado Jobo
 Kawagarbo

References

Bibliography

External links

Google Maps Pro of 15 Sacred Mountains in China 
Google Earth Map of both Five and Four Sacred Mountains KMZ File
—Why the five sacred mountains survive in a good ecological state
A Report on the Nine Sacred Mountains

 
Buddhism in China
Taoism in China
Religious buildings and structures in China